Harold James Halse (1 January 1886 – 25 March 1949) was an English football forward, who played most of his career for Manchester United and then for Chelsea. He was the first player to appear in three FA Cup finals for three clubs. He is also the highest scoring player in a Charity Shield match, having scored six goals in the 1911 edition for Manchester United.

Career
He was born in Stratford, London and started his football career as an amateur with Wanstead, Newportians, Barking Town and Clapton Orient, where he made two appearances with one goal in the Football League.

He then joined Southend United, scoring 91 goals in 65 appearances in the 1906–07 season. He transferred to Manchester United in 1908 for the maximum transfer fee allowed at that time, £350. He scored 56 goals in 125 appearances for United, and won the First Division title in 1908 and 1911, and the FA Cup in 1909. In the 1911 FA Charity Shield against Swindon Town, Halse scored six goals for United in an 8–4 win for his team.

He moved to Aston Villa for £1200 in 1912. He won the 1913 FA Cup with Villa and also scored all 5 when Aston Villa beat Derby County 5–1,but signed for Chelsea shortly afterwards. While at Chelsea Halse once again reached an FA Cup final, in 1915, although this time he finished on the losing side. He remained with Chelsea until 1921, scoring 25 goals in 111 games, and had a spell at Charlton Athletic before retiring in 1923.

Halse was the first player to appear in three FA Cup finals for three clubs.

Halse was capped once for England, in an 8–1 win over Austria on 1 June 1909. He scored twice in this game.

He died on 25 March 1949, aged 63.

Honours
Manchester United
First Division: 1907–08, 1910–11
FA Cup: 1908–09
FA Charity Shield: 1911

Aston Villa
FA Cup: 1912–13

Chelsea
FA Cup runner-up:  1914–15

References

1886 births
English footballers
England international footballers
Barking F.C. players
Leyton Orient F.C. players
Southend United F.C. players
Manchester United F.C. players
Aston Villa F.C. players
Chelsea F.C. players
Charlton Athletic F.C. players
1949 deaths
English Football League players
English Football League representative players
Association football forwards
FA Cup Final players